Norman DeValois Dicks (born December 16, 1940) is an American lawyer and politician who served as the U.S. representative for , between 1977 and 2013. He is a member of the Democratic Party.  His district was located in the northwestern corner of the state, and includes most of Tacoma.  He retired at the end of the 112th Congress. He currently serves as Senior Policy Advisor at the law and public policy firm Van Ness Feldman LLP. He is the longest-serving member ever of the United States House of Representatives from the state of Washington.

Early life, education, and early political career
Norm Dicks was born and raised in Bremerton, Washington. His family attended Our Saviour's Lutheran Church in Bremerton, and he was confirmed there as a teenager. He attended the University of Washington, where he was a linebacker on the Huskies football team and was a member of Sigma Nu Fraternity. He earned a B.A. and a J.D. degree there.

After college, he became legislative and administrative assistant to long-serving U.S. Senator Warren G. Magnuson of Washington.

U.S. House of Representatives

Elections

In 1976, incumbent Democrat U.S. Representative Floyd Hicks decided to retire to run for a Washington State Supreme Court seat. Dicks qualified for the general election via the blanket primary and won the general election with 74% of the vote against Republican nominee Rob Reynolds. He won re-election 17 more times and only got less than 58% of the vote in a November general election once (1980). That year, he defeated Republican nominee Jim Beaver 54% to 46%, the lowest winning percentage and margin of victory in his career. His second lowest general election winning percentage is 58%, in 1994 and 2010 (both years when Republicans took back the majority).

Tenure

Elected to the House in 1976, he won a coveted seat on the House Appropriations Committee in his first term. He became a "powerful . . . senior Democrat" on that committee. He also served for 8 years on the House Intelligence Committee. As a member of Congress, he was known as a close friend of Al Gore.

On March 28, 1981, Norm Dicks attended the christening of the USS Bremerton (SSN 698) along with U.S. Senator Henry M. Jackson.

On October 10, 2002, Norm Dicks was among the 81 House Democrats who voted in favor of authorizing the invasion of Iraq but later changed his position and supports an end to the war. With Boeing a major employer in Washington, Dicks has also supported the acquisition of military aircraft on the Defense Appropriations Subcommittee.

On October 22, 2004, Dicks cut the ribbon during the dedication ceremony for the Norm Dicks Government Center in Bremerton, Washington. On June 9, 2007, he presented the 132nd commencement speech at the University of Washington.  Recently, Congressman Dicks was given the 2008 Ansel Adams Conservation Award by The Wilderness Society, and in 2010, Congressman Dicks was the first recipient of Washington non-profit Long Live the King's annual Lifetime Achievement Award in Salmon Conservation.

In June 2007, Dicks expressed support for a House of Representatives bill that would increase funding for environmental protection, national parks and conservation by approximately $1.2 billion. In support of the bill, he said "The Bush administration has cut the Interior Department budget over the last six to seven years by 16 percent..."It has cut EPA by 29 percent. It has cut the Forest Service by 35 percent. It has devastated these agencies...We are trying to turn the corner, to bring these agencies back".
In 2008 the U.S. Navy Memorial Foundation awarded Congressman Dicks its Naval Heritage Award for his support of the U S Navy and military during his terms in Congress on the Appropriations Committee.

On May 8, 2008, Norm Dicks voted yes on H.R. 4279: Prioritizing Resources and Organization for Intellectual Property Act of 2007, sometimes called the PRO-IP Act.  The PRO-IP Act increases both civil and criminal penalties for trademark and copyright infringement. It has created a new executive branch office, the Office of the United States Intellectual Property Enforcement Representative (USIPER). In addition to fines, preliminary punishments involve the seizing of unlicensed copies and the devices on which the copies are stored.

On June 20, 2008, Representative Dicks voted yes on the controversial FISA Amendments Act of 2008. The bill would provide immunity for AT&T, Verizon Communications and other U.S. telecommunications companies against 40 lawsuits alleging that they violated customers' privacy rights by helping the government's NSA electronic surveillance program conduct a warrantless spying program after the September 11th attacks.

The bill also sought to:

Require FISA court permission to wiretap Americans who are overseas.
Prohibit targeting a foreigner to secretly eavesdrop on an American's calls or e-mails without court approval.
Allow the FISA court 30 days to review existing but expiring surveillance orders before renewing them.
Allow eavesdropping in emergencies without court approval, provided the government files required papers within a week.
Prohibit the government from invoking war powers or other authorities to supersede surveillance rules in the future.

Committee assignments
Committee on Appropriations (Ranking Member)
As ranking member of the full committee, Rep. Dicks may sit as an ex officio member of all subcommittees.
Subcommittee on Defense (Ranking Member)

Caucus memberships
International Conservation Caucus (Co-Chair)
Sportsmen's Caucus
Congressional Arts Caucus

Retirement and ongoing civic engagement
When deciding to retire from Congress in 2012, Dicks said his biggest regret was voting for the Iraq War. "I'm still glad Saddam Hussein is not there, but I feel we were misled, not intentionally misled, but we were not given accurate information, and if we had known Saddam Hussein did not have weapons of mass destruction, I don't think Congress would even have been asked to vote on that."

In 2013, the former congressman joined the board of the Seattle non-profit Long Live the Kings as an Ambassador to a new U.S./Canada partnership, the Salish Sea Marine Survival project, stating that: "Efforts like the joint US/Canada Salish Sea Marine Survival Project promise to fundamentally change our knowledge about salmon and steelhead in saltwater; filling a crucial information-gap that has inhibited the progress of recovery." In 2014, Dicks was elected to the board of directors of the National Bureau of Asian Research.

Electoral history

|+ : Results 1976–2010
! Year
!
! Democrat
! Votes
! %
!
! Republican
! Votes
! %
!
! Third party
! Party
! Votes
! %
!
! Third party
! Party
! Votes
! %
!
|-
|1976
||
| |Norm Dicks
| |137,964
| |73%
|
| |Robert Reynolds
| |47,539
| |25%
|
||Michael Duane
||U.S. Labor
||2,251
||1%
|
|
|
|
|
|
|-
|1978
||
| |Norm Dicks
| |71,057
| |61%
|
| |James Beaver
| |43,640
| |37%
|
|! style="background:#aa0000; "|Mary Smith
|! style="background:#aa0000; "|Socialist Workers
|! style="background:#aa0000; "|2,043
|! style="background:#aa0000; "|2%
|
|
|
|
|
|
|-
|1980
||
| |Norm Dicks
| |122,903
| |54%
|
| |James Beaver
| |106,236
| |46%
|
|
|
|
|
|
|
|
|
|
|
|-
|1982
||
| |Norm Dicks
| |89,985
| |63%
|
| |Ted Haley
| |47,720
| |33%
|
| |Jayne Anderson
| |Independent
| align="right" |6,193
| align="right" |4%
|
|
|
|
|
|
|-
|1984
||
| |Norm Dicks
| |124,367
| |66%
|
| |Mike Lonergan
| |60,721
| |32%
|
| |Dan Blachly
| |Libertarian
| align="right" |2,953
| align="right" |2%
|
|
|
|
|
|
|-
|1986
||
| |Norm Dicks
| |90,063
| |71%
|
| |Don McDonald
| |36,410
| |29%
|
|
|
|
|
|
|
|
|
|
|
|-
|1988
||
| |Norm Dicks
| |125,904
| |68%
|
| |Kevin Cook
| |60,346
| |32%
|
|
|
|
|
|
|
|
|
|
|
|-
|1990
||
| |Norm Dicks
| |79,079
| |61%
|
| |Bert Mueller
| |49,786
| |39%
|
|
|
|
|
|
|
|
|
|
|
|-
|1992
||
| |Norm Dicks
| |152,933
| |69%
|
| |Lauri Phillips
| |49,786
| |22%
|
| |Tom Donnelly
| |Independent
| align="right" |14,490
| align="right" |7%
|
| |Jim Horrigan
| |Libertarian
| align="right" |4,075
| align="right" |2%
|
|-
|1994
||
| |Norm Dicks
| |105,480
| |58%
|
| |Benjamin Gregg
| |75,322
| |42%
|
|
|
|
|
|
|
|
|
|
|
|-
|1996
||
| |Norm Dicks
| |155,467
| |66%
|
| |Bill Tinsley
| |71,337
| |30%
|
| |Ted Haley
| |Independent
| align="right" |5,561
| align="right" |2%
|
| |Jim Horrigan
| |Libertarian
| align="right" |4,075
| align="right" |2%
|
|-
|1998
||
| |Norm Dicks
| |143,308
| |68%
|
| |Bob Lawrence
| |66,291
| |32%
|
|
|
|
|
|
|
|
|
|
|
|-
|2000
||
| |Norm Dicks
| |164,853
| |65%
|
| |Bob Lawrence
| |79,215
| |31%
|
| |John Bennett
| |Libertarian
| align="right" |10,645
| align="right" |4%
|
|
|
|
|
|
|-
|2002
||
| |Norm Dicks
| |126,116
| |64%
|
| |Bob Lawrence
| |61,584
| |31%
|
| |John Bennett
| |Libertarian
| align="right" |8,744
| align="right" |4%
|
|
|
|
|
|
|-
|2004
||
| |Norm Dicks
| |202,919
| |69%
|
| |Doug Cloud
| |91,228
| |31%
|
|
|
|
|
|
|
|
|
|
|
|-
|2006
||
| |Norm Dicks
| |158,202
| |71%
|
| |Doug Cloud
| |63,883
| |29%
|
|
|
|
|
|
|
|
|
|
|
|-
|2008
||
| |Norm Dicks
| |205,991
| |67%
|
| |Doug Cloud
| |102,081
| |33%
|
|
|
|
|
|
|
|
|
|
|
|-
|2010
||
| |Norm Dicks
| |151,873
| |58%
|
| |Doug Cloud
| |109,800
| |42%
|
|
|
|
|
|
|
|
|
|
|

References

External links

Congressman Norm Dicks official U.S. House website
Norm Dicks for U.S. Congress official campaign website
 
Profile at SourceWatch
Norm Dicks Government Center dedication, Eric D. Williams, City of Bremerton, October 24, 2004
Dicks gets greenie award Seattle Post-Intelligencer, March 31, 2008

|-

|-

|-

1940 births
Living people
People from Bremerton, Washington
University of Washington alumni
American Lutherans
University of Washington School of Law alumni
Democratic Party members of the United States House of Representatives from Washington (state)
21st-century American politicians
National Bureau of Asian Research
United States congressional aides
Washington (state) lawyers
Members of Congress who became lobbyists